Equity, or economic equality, is the concept or idea of fairness in economics, particularly in regard to taxation or welfare economics. More specifically, it may refer to a movement that strives to provide equal life chances regardless of identity, to provide all citizens with a basic and equal minimum of income, goods, and services or to increase funds and commitment for redistribution.

Overview
According to Peter Corning, there are three distinct categories of substantive fairness (equality, equity, and reciprocity) that must be combined and balanced in order to achieve a truly fair society.    Inequality and inequities have significantly increased in recent decades.

Equity is based on the idea of moral equality. Equity looks at the distribution of capital, goods, and access to services throughout an economy and is often measured using tools such as the Gini index. Equity may be distinguished from economic efficiency in overall evaluation of social welfare. Although 'equity' has broader uses, it may be posed as a counterpart to economic inequality in yielding a "good" distribution of wealth. It has been studied in experimental economics as inequity aversion.

Taxation
In public finance, horizontal equity is the idea that people with a similar ability to pay taxes should pay the same or similar amounts. It is related to the concept of tax neutrality or the idea that the tax system should not discriminate between similar things or people, or unduly distort behavior.

Vertical equity usually refers to the idea that people with a greater ability to pay taxes should pay more.  If the rich pay more in proportion to their income, this is known as a proportional tax; if they pay an increasing proportion, this is termed a  progressive tax, sometimes associated with redistribution of wealth.

Fair division
Equitability in fair division means every person’s subjective valuation of their own share of some goods is the same. The surplus procedure (SP) achieves a more complex variant called proportional equitability. For more than two people, a division cannot always both be equitable and envy-free.

See also
 Distributive justice
 Educational equity
 Equity (law)
 Excess burden of taxation
 Justice (economics)
 Progressive tax
 Proportional tax
 Tax incidence
 Who Moved My Cheese

Notes

References
 Anthony B. Atkinson and Joseph E. Stiglitz (1980). Lectures in Public Economics, McGraw-Hill. Economics Handbook Series.
 Xavier Calsamiglia and Alan Kirman (1993). "A Unique Informationally Efficient and Decentralized Mechanism with Fair Outcomes," Econometrica, 61(5), p p. 1147-1172.
 A.J. Culyer (1995). "Need: The Idea Won't Do — But We Still Need It," Social Science and Medicine, 40(6), pp. 727–730.
Jean-Yves Duclos (2008). "horizontal and vertical equity," The New Palgrave Dictionary of Economics, 2nd Edition. Abstract.
 Allan M. Feldman (1987). "equity," The New Palgrave: A Dictionary of Economics, v. 2, pp. 182–84.
 Peter J. Hammond (1987). "altruism," The New Palgrave: A Dictionary of Economics, v. 1, pp. 85–87.
 Serge-Christophe Kolm ([1972] 2000). Justice and Equity. Description &  chapter-preview links. MIT Press.
 Julian Le Grand (1991). Equity and Choice: An Essay in Economics and Applied Philosophy. Chapter preview links.
Richard A. Musgrave (1959). The Theory of Public Finance: A Study in Political Economy.
_ (1987 [2008]). "public finance," The New Palgrave: A Dictionary of Economics, v. 3, pp. 1055–60. Abstract.
 Richard A. Musgrave and Peggy B. Musgrave (1973). Public Finance in Theory and Practice
 Joseph E. Stiglitz (2000). Economics of the Public Sector, 3rd ed. Norton.
 William Thomson (2008). "fair allocation," The New Palgrave Dictionary of Economics, 2nd Edition. Abstract.
 World Bank. World Development Report 2006: Equity and Development.Summary with ch. links.
H. Peyton Young (1994). Equity: In Theory and Practice. Princeton University Press. Description, preview, and chapter 1.
Colombino, U., Locatelli, M., Narazani, E., & O'Donoghue, C. (2010). Alternative basic income mechanisms: An evaluation exercise with a microeconometric model. Basic Income Studies, 5(1).

Fairness criteria
Tax incidence
Welfare economics